Phyllonorycter grewiaecola is a moth of the family Gracillariidae. It is known from Namibia, South Africa, Zimbabwe and Kenya.

The forewings are elongate and the ground colour is ochreous brown with white markings. The hindwings are pale ochreous with a golden shine with a long, pale golden and shiny fringe. Adults are on wing from February to August.

The larvae feed on Grewia kwebensis and Grewia tristis. They mine the leaves of their host plant. The mine has the form of a small oval, tentiform mine, either on the upper or underside of the leaf.

References

Moths described in 1961
grewiaecola
Moths of Africa